Akkupalli is a village in Srikakulam district of the Indian state of Andhra Pradesh. It is located in Vajrapukotturu mandal.

Demographics
Akkupalli village has population of 2,252 of which 1,064 are males while 1,188 are females as per Population 2011, Indian Census.

Tourism
Akkupalli village is home to the popular Akkupalli Beach.

References

Villages in Srikakulam district